Ctenotus ehmanni, also known commonly as the brown-tailed finesnout ctenotus or Ehmann's ctenotus, is a species of skink, a lizard in the family Scincidae. The species is endemic to the Australian state of Western Australia.

Etymology
The specific name, ehmanni, is in honor of Australian herpetologist Harry Ehmann.

Habitat
The preferred natural habitat of C. ehmanni is forest.

Reproduction
C. ehmanni is oviparous.

References

Further reading
Cogger HG (2014). Reptiles and Amphibians of Australia, Seventh Edition. Clayton, Victoria, Australia: CSIRO Publishing. xxx + 1,033 pp. .
Storr GM (1985). "Two New Skinks (Lacertilia : Scincidae) from Western Australia". Records of the Western Australian Museum 12 (2): 193–196. (Ctenotus ehmanni, new species, pp. 193–194, Figure 1).
Wilson S, Swan G (2013). A Complete Guide to Reptiles of Australia, Fourth Edition. Sydney: New Holland Publishers. 522 pp. .

ehmanni
Reptiles described in 1985
Taxa named by Glen Milton Storr